Cupid Stupid, formerly known as The Stars of Love, is a TVB modern romance series which premiered on Malaysia's Astro On Demand Channel from 25 January 2010 until 25 February 2010.

Synopsis 
Chi Yat-Po (Steven Ma), a fishmonger constantly helps his friend Kan Ngo-Lam (Tavia Yeung) who is always getting into trouble with her "bad" boyfriends. The two friends meet Koon Sing-Ho (Michael Tse), a famous toymaker, who has the talent to make anything he desires into a game.  They are also introduced to Fong Cheuk-Kei (Mandy Cho), Sing-Ho's girlfriend, who tries her best to put up with his mischievous ways.

Chi Yat-Po is in love with Ngo-Lam, but never has the courage to tell her. When he finally decides to reveal his true feelings, he is stopped by the meddling Wong Man-Keun (Shermon Tang), Ngo-Lam's best friend who has a crush on Chi-Yat Po.

Sing-Ho and Ngo-Lam both share strong believe in horoscopes and fortunes, however in the later chapters they find out they have more in common than just horoscopes. The two find themselves developing feelings for each other and soon become a couple. However, Ngo-Lam soon finds out that Chi Yat-Po has liked her for a long time and she finds herself torn between Sing-Ho and Yat-Po. To complicate matters more, Cheuk-Kei begins dating Sing-Ho's arch-rival, Frankie (Ruco Chan).

Meanwhile, Chi-Yat Po's aunt, Chi Kam Kiu (Kingdom Yuen) finds herself constantly arguing with her ex-husband (Lee Kwok Lun), whom she shares an apartment with. She utterly despises him and regrets marrying him. She is angered by the reappearance of a man named Greeny (Ram Chiang), a horoscope expert who told her to marry her husband. When Greeny finds out about the divorce and the tears she has been through, he tries his best to make up with Kam-Kiu, and at the same time he tries to hide the fact that he has feelings for her...

The characters face many trials of love before they each find who is the one truly most important to them in their hearts.

Cast

Chi Family

Kan Family

Wong Family

Children's Dream Toy Company

Other casts

External links 
K for TVB Cupid Stupid - Series Synopsis 

TVB dramas
2010 Hong Kong television series debuts
2010 Hong Kong television series endings